The San Diego State Aztecs women's soccer team is a varsity intercollegiate athletic team of San Diego State University in San Diego, California, United States. The team is a member of the Mountain West Conference, which is part of the National Collegiate Athletic Association's Division I. San Diego State's first women's soccer team was fielded in 1989. The team plays its home games at SDSU Sports Deck in San Diego. The Aztecs are coached by Mike Friesen.

All-time season results

Postseason

The Aztecs women's soccer team have an NCAA Division I Tournament record of 4–7 through seven appearances.

Head coaches 
 Chuck Clegg (1989, 1994–2003
 Lesle Gallimore (1990–1993)
 Mike Giuliano (2004–2006)
 Mike Friesen (2007–present)

References

External links 
 

San Diego State Aztecs women's soccer
1989 establishments in California
Association football clubs established in 1989